Verijärv (or Kasaritsa Verijärv) is a lake in Estonia. It lies in Võru Parish, just outside the city of Võru.
The lake is part of the Verijärv Landscape Conservation Area (Verijärve maastikukaitseala).

See also
List of lakes of Estonia

Lakes of Estonia
Võru Parish
Lakes of Võru County

References